The Trinidad Sandstone is a geologic formation in northeastern New Mexico and southeastern Colorado. It was formed during the Campanian Age of the Cretaceous Period and contains fossils.

Description
It rests conformably on the Pierre Shale and is in turn conformably overlain by the Vermejo Formation.

The formation is interpreted as shore deposits marking the final regression of the Western Interior Seaway from northeastern New Mexico. It is correlative with the Fox Hills Sandstone and the Pictured Cliffs Sandstone.

Fossils
The formation contains trace fossils of Ophiomorpha and, in a few locations, Diplocraterion.

Economic geology
There is potential for natural gas extraction from the Trinidad Sandstone. The gas originates in interbedded coal formations.

History of investigation
The beds making up this unit were originally included in Hayden's Raton Hills group in 1869. The name, Trinidad, was first applied by R.C. Hills in 1899, and W.T. Lee (1917) further refined the definition to include only Hills' "Upper Trinidad".

References

Bibliography 
 
 
 
 
 

Cretaceous Colorado
Cretaceous formations of New Mexico